Yponomeuta pustulellus is a moth of the family Yponomeutidae. Described by Francis Walker in 1863, it is found in Australia.

External links
Australian Faunal Directory
CSIRO Entomology

Yponomeutidae